The Best of Warrant  is the first greatest hits compilation album by the American rock band Warrant, released in 1996. It features the band's greatest tracks (singles) from their first three studio albums, "Dirty Rotten Filthy Stinking Rich", "Cherry Pie" and "Dog Eat Dog". It does not contain any material from the band's 1995 album Ultraphobic.

Track information
The album includes two bonus tracks: "Thin Disguise" which is a B-side from the Cherry Pie single (not included on any studio album) and "We Will Rock You" which is a cover of the Queen song of the same name and was released on the soundtrack to the 1992 film Gladiator starring Cuba Gooding Jr. The Warrant version of "We Will Rock You" charted at number 83 on The Billboard Hot 100. The version of I Saw Red is the acoustic version previously released as a B-side from the single of the same song. The acoustic version features a music video and was also released as a single in its own right.

Track listing 
 "Down Boys"
 "32 Pennies"
 "Heaven"
 "D.R.F.S.R."
 "Big Talk"
 "Sometimes She Cries"
 "Cherry Pie"
 "Thin Disguise" (Previously unreleased)
 "Uncle Tom's Cabin"
 "I Saw Red" - (Acoustic version)
 "Bed of Roses"
 "Mr. Rainmaker"
 "Sure Feels Good to Me"
 "Hole in My Wall"
 "Machine Gun"
 "We Will Rock You" (New)

References

External links 
 Warrant Official Site
 Classic Warrant Videos on Sony BMG MusicBox

1996 compilation albums
Warrant (American band) albums